Metalanguage is a language used to describe another language, in logic and linguistics, as well as metaprogramming.

Meta language may refer to:
 ML (programming language)
 Meta' language, spoken in Cameroon

See also 
 Natural semantic metalanguage, a linguistic theory reducing lexicons to sets of semantic primitives